Keith David Day (born 29 November 1962 in Grays) is a former professional footballer who played in the Football League as a defender.

Career
Day made appearances for Colchester United and Leyton Orient in the Football League and non-league football for Aveley, Sittingbourne, Farnborough Town and Grays Athletic.

Honours

Club
Leyton Orient
 Football League Fourth Division Playoff Winner (1): 1988–89

Individual
 PFA Team of the Year (1): 1987–88

References

External links
 
 Keith Day at Colchester United Archive Database

1962 births
Living people
English footballers
Association football central defenders
People from Grays, Essex
Colchester United F.C. players
Leyton Orient F.C. players
Aveley F.C. players
Sittingbourne F.C. players
Farnborough F.C. players
Grays Athletic F.C. players
Romford F.C. players